Ilu-shuma or Ilu-šūma, inscribed DINGIR-šum-ma, son of Shalim-ahum was a king of Assyria in the 20th century BC. The length of his reign is uncertain, as the Assyrian King List records him as one of the "six kings whose names were written on bricks, but whose eponyms are not known", referring to the lists of officials after which years were named.

His son, Erishum I, is identified as the king who succeeded him and reigned for 40 years (or 30, depending on the copy of the Assyrian King List), followed by Ilu-shuma's other son, Ikunum. He titled himself "vice-regent of Assur, beloved of the god Ashur and the goddess Ishtar." The Synchronistic King List records, "eighty-two kings of Assyria from Erishum I, son of Ilu-shuma, to Ashurbanipal, son of Esarhaddon", in the concluding colophon.

Biography 
The Chronicle of Early Kings records his contemporary as Su-abu, who was once identified with the founder of the First Dynasty of Babylon, Sumu-abum, c. 1830 BC. The word "battles" is discernible on the subsequent, fragmentary line of the Chronicle and this has led some historians to believe Ilu-shuma may have engaged in conflict with his southerly neighbor. A brick inscription of Ilu-shuma describes his relations with the south and reads:

The historian M. Trolle Larsen has suggested that this represented an attempt to lure traders from the south of Assur with tax privileges and exemptions, to monopolize the exchange of copper from the gulf for tin from the east. The cities cited therefore are the three major caravan routes the commodities would have traveled rather than campaign routes for the king.

Ilu-shuma's construction activities included building the old temple of Ishtar, a city wall, subdivision of the city into house plots and diversion of the flow of two springs to the city gates Aushum and Wertum. Tukultī-Ninurta I recorded that he preceded him by 720 years, on his own inscriptions commemorating his construction of an adjacent Ishtar temple. From this it might be deduced that, despite later being among the "kings whose year names are not known", the reign length of Ilu-shuma was still known in the time of Tukulti-Ninurta I to be 21 years. Larsen has suggested that he may have been a contemporary of Iddin-Dagan and Ishme-Dagan of Isin, which would clash with the synchronization with Sumu-abum, but make more sense given the current chronology favored.

See also 

 Timeline of the Assyrian Empire
 Early Period of Assyria
 List of Assyrian kings
 Assyrian continuity
 Assyrian people
 Assyria

Inscriptions

Notes

References 

20th-century BC Assyrian kings